Jiří Maštálka (born 3 January 1956, in Sušice) is a Czech politician and Member of the European Parliament for the Communist Party of Bohemia and Moravia; part of the European United Left–Nordic Green Left party group in the European Parliament.

In March 2016 he received the Russian Order of Friendship from President Vladimir Putin for great contribution to strengthening the friendship and cooperation with the Russian Federation.

References 

1956 births
Living people
Communist Party of Bohemia and Moravia MEPs
MEPs for the Czech Republic 2004–2009
MEPs for the Czech Republic 2009–2014
MEPs for the Czech Republic 2014–2019
Communist Party of Czechoslovakia politicians
People from Sušice